Admiral Seymour may refer to:

Beauchamp Seymour, 1st Baron Alcester (1821–1895), British Royal Navy admiral
Edward Seymour (Royal Navy officer) (1840–1929), British Royal Navy admiral
Edward Seymour, 1st Duke of Somerset (1500–1552), Lord High Admiral of England
George Seymour (Royal Navy officer) (1787–1870), British Royal Navy admiral
Lord Henry Seymour (naval commander) (1540–1588), English Navy vice admiral
Lord Hugh Seymour (1759–1801), British Royal Navy vice admiral
Michael Seymour (Royal Navy officer, born 1802) (1802–1887), British Royal Navy admiral
Sir Michael Seymour, 1st Baronet (1768–1834), British Royal Navy rear admiral
Thomas Seymour, 1st Baron Seymour of Sudeley (c. 1508–1549), Lord High Admiral of England